Evenus , Euenos , Evinos, or Evenos may refer to:

 Evinos, a river in western Greece
 Evenus (mythology), a river god and two mythological kings in ancient Greece
 Evenus (butterfly), a butterfly genus, occasionally misspelled Euenus
 Euenus (Euenos, Evenus) of Paros, Ancient Greek philosopher
 Évenos, France, a commune in the Var department